The Mercer and Somerset Railway was a short-lived line of the Pennsylvania Railroad in western New Jersey, built to delay completion of the Delaware and Bound Brook Railroad, part of the National Railway line (later owned by the Philadelphia and Reading Railway) from Philadelphia, Pennsylvania to New York City.

The railroad ran from Somerset Junction on the Belvidere Delaware Rail Road via Pennington and Hopewell to Millstone. A connection to the Millstone and New Brunswick Railroad for a through route to New Brunswick.  The bridges over the river and canal at East Millstone were completed by November 22, 1873  by January 10, 1874, the was completed but only a portion open to traffic the line was fully opened to traffic by March 7, 1874.  The Mercer & Somerset Railway lost its battle with the Delaware and Bound Brook Railroad. Thus, it was bankrupt, defunct and dismantled by 1880. A stone pillar in the middle of the Millstone River just south of Amwell Road still remains today, built as part of the infrastructure to carry the tracks across the river. Hopewell was the site of a frog war with the National Railway.

A plan existed at one time to extend the Philadelphia, Newtown and New York Railroad, another railroad being built to block the National Railway, to cross the Delaware River and connect with the M&S.

History
The railroad was chartered on March 17, 1870, by the United New Jersey Railroad and Canal Companies for the sole purpose of tying up the construction of the National Railway. In 1873, the M&S had plans to straighten out the line as part of a new through railroad operated by the PRR. No straightening was done, but it did become PRR-operated. The railroad was formally opened on February 6, 1874, with an excursion train from Millstone to Trenton. At the beginning, it was leased by the United New Jersey Railroad and Canal Company and operated by the Belvidere Delaware Rail Road. By mid-1875, the railroad was being operated by the PRR as their Mercer and Somerset Branch, part of a through route from New York. 
The M&S served as one of several legal challenges to the National Railway line from Philadelphia to New York. Others were the Philadelphia, Newtown and New York Railroad in Pennsylvania and a fight over whether they had the right to cross the Delaware River. The New Jersey-side one resulted in a frog war at Hopewell in early 1876. The National Railway won the battle, and the Delaware and Bound Brook Railroad formally opened on April 27, 1876.

The M&S was sold under bankruptcy to the Pennsylvania Railroad on November 28, 1879. The alignment was officially abandoned by the Pennsylvania on January 29, 1880.

It was soon dismantled, since it no longer served its purpose to block the National Railway. The abandoned grade of the west end of the line became Jacobs Creek Road.

Station listing

References

Notes 
Railroad History Database
State Legislatures, New York Times March 16, 1870 page 5
New-York and Suburban News, New York Times April 10, 1873 page 8
Railroad Matters in New-Jersey, New York Times February 9, 1874 page 8
Railroads (display ad), New York Times July 11, 1875 page 8
Railway War in New-Jersey, New York Times January 7, 1876 page 1
Railroad Affairs, New York Times January 8, 1876 page 2
The Excursion to Philadelphia, New York Times April 28, 1876 page 7
Notes from Different Roads, New York Times November 29, 1879 page 2

Predecessors of the Pennsylvania Railroad
Defunct New Jersey railroads
Transportation in Mercer County, New Jersey
Transportation in Somerset County, New Jersey
Railway companies established in 1870
Railway companies disestablished in 1879